General Slade may refer to:

John Ramsay Slade (1843–1913), British Army major general
Sir John Slade, 1st Baronet (1762–1859), British Army general
Marcus Slade (1801–1872), British Army lieutenant general